Green v. Brennan, 578 U.S. ___ (2016), was a United States Supreme Court case in which the Court held that when filing a workplace discrimination complaint under Title VII of the Civil Rights Act of 1964, the filing period begins only after an employee resigns. The filing period begins at the time that the employee gives notice of resignation, not the effective date of resignation.

Background 
Marvin Green was denied a promotion at the United States Postal Service. He alleged that he was denied the promotion because he was black and U.S.P.S. counter-alleged that Green had engaged in the crime of intentionally delaying the mail.

Opinion of the Court 
Associate Justice Sonia Sotomayor authored the Court's decision.

References

External links
 
 SCOTUSblog coverage

United States Supreme Court cases
United States Supreme Court cases of the Roberts Court
2016 in United States case law
United States Postal Service litigation
United States civil rights case law
United States racial discrimination case law